North Buck Lake is a lake in Alberta, Canada.

Athabasca County
North Buck Lake